Solah Satra is a 1990 Indian romance film directed by Munna Rizvi, starring Ektaa and Arbaaz in the lead roles and the debuting Ashwin Verma and Kulbhushan Kharbanda as antagonists. Ajit Vachani, Sushmita Mukherjee and Kunika play supporting roles. Famous Pakistani pop singer Hasan Jahangir made a special appearance in the song "Aapan Ka To Dil Hai Awara". The film was produced by Kiran Vohra under the Vijay Kiran Films banner.

Cast
Arbaaz Ali Khan as Vikram "Vicky" Kumar
Ekta Sohini as Neha
Ashwin Verma as Inspector Vishal
Kulbhushan Kharbanda as Kedar Nath
Sushmita Mukherjee as Rosie
Ajit Vachani as Police Commissioner
Kunika as Kedar Nath's wife
Hasan Jahangir as Himself (Special appearance in a song "Aapan Ka To Dil Hai Awara")

Soundtrack

The music of Solah Satra is composed by Nadeem-Shravan under HMV banner with lyrics penned by Rani Malik and Saeed Rahi. Famous Pakistani pop singer Hasan Jahangir lent his voice for the track "Aapan Ka To Dil Hai Awara". "Ajab Zindagi Ka" by Vinod Rathod was the most successful song of the track.

Track listing

External links
 
 

1990 films
1990s Hindi-language films
Films scored by Nadeem–Shravan
Films shot in India